The 2018–19 Oregon State Beavers women's basketball team represented Oregon State University during the 2018–19 NCAA Division I women's basketball season. The Beavers, led by ninth year head coach Scott Rueck, played their games at the Gill Coliseum and were members of the Pac-12 Conference. They finished the season with a record of 26-8 (14-4 Pac-12). They played in the quarterfinals of the Pac-12 Women's Tournament where they were upset by Washington. They received an at-large bid to the NCAA Women's Tournament where they defeated Boise State in the first round, and Gonzaga in the second round, before losing to Louisville for the 2nd consecutive year in the Sweet 16.

Roster

Schedule

|-
!colspan=9 style=| Exhibition

|-
!colspan=9 style=| Non-conference regular season

|-
!colspan=9 style=| Pac-12 regular season

|-
!colspan=9 style=|Pac-12 Women's Tournament

|-
!colspan=9 style=|NCAA Women's Tournament

Rankings
2018–19 NCAA Division I women's basketball rankings

^Coaches did not release a Week 2 poll.

See also
2018–19 Oregon State Beavers men's basketball team

References

Oregon State Beavers women's basketball seasons
Oregon State
Oregon State Beavers women's basketball
Oregon State Beavers women's basketball
Oregon State